Saint Felix School is a 2–18 mixed, private, day and boarding school in Reydon, Southwold, Suffolk, England. The school was founded in 1897 as a school for girls but is now co-educational.

History
The school was founded in 1897 as a girls' school by Margaret Isabella Gardiner.

By September 1902, the present site of the school had been purchased and the first four boarding houses and teaching block completed. In 1909 Lucy Mary Silcox took over as headmistress from the founding head. The student roll grew and in 1910, the Gardiner Assembly Hall and a Library were built and Clough House followed in 1914.

Silcox was able to bring leading thinkers and artists to the school and money was found to buy sculpture and paintings. The modernist paintings inspired pupils like the artist  Gwyneth Johnstone who remembered seeing work by Chistopher Wood at the school. Silcox directed the girls in ancient Greek plays. The students knew she was President of the local National Union of Women's Suffrage Societies as she gave talks in surrounding villages in support of women gaining the vote. 
The school continued during the 1914-18 war and during the 1916-1917 school year there was an outpost of the school at Penmaenmawr as some parents were worried about their students' safety. The whole school was evacuated three times and the school took in some Serbian refugees.

Today
The school accommodates babies and toddlers in the St Felix Nursery, and children up to the age of 18 in the Sixth Form. The school offers boarding throughout the term, weekly, or 'flexi' boarding. The current head is Mr James Harrison.

Notable former pupils 

 Griselda Allan - artist
 Jane Benham MBE – artist and sailor who worked to preserve Thames sailing barges
 Dorothea Braby – artist and illustrator
 Dorothy Elizabeth Bradford - painter
 Stella Browne – feminist and abortion law reformer
 Natalie Caine – woodwind player
 Constance Coltman – the first woman ordained to Christian ministry in Britain
 Katherine Laird Cox – model, magistrate
 Nora David, Baroness David, politician and life peer
 Phyllis Gardner – artist and dog breeder
 Nick Griffin – Former BNP leader and MEP for North West England (1999–2014)
 Lilias Rider Haggard MBE, daughter of Sir Henry Rider Haggard and an author in her own right
 Norman Heatley – biochemist
 Gwyneth Johnstone - painter
 Emily Beatrix Coursolles Jones – novelist
 Nancy Lyle – tennis player
 Violet Helen Millar, later Countess Attlee, wife of Clement Attlee
 Mother Maribel of Wantage – Anglican nun and artist
 Anna Russell – singer and comedian
 Enid Russell-Smith DBE – civil servant
 Mary Snell-Hornby – translation scholar
 Constance Tipper – metallurgist and crystallographer
 Hannah Waterman – actress
 Dame Barbara Woodward - diplomat

Notable staff 
 Lucy Mary Silcox, headmistress from 1909 to 1926
 Anne Mustoe, headmistress from 1978 to 1987

See also 
 List of schools in Suffolk

References

External links 
 
 Profile on the ISC website

Private schools in Suffolk
Boarding schools in Suffolk
Educational institutions established in 1897
1897 establishments in England
Reydon